Kamikaze, stylized as kəmikəze, is a Thai record label owned by RS Public Company Limited. It was founded in 2007, and was originally managed by that time RS executive producer Sudhipong Vatanajang. The label focused on young artists and catered to a target audience aged 10 to 17 years, as part of RS's restructuring plan to have multiple sublabels focusing on specific audience segments. Some of its best known early artists include Four–Mod, Faye Fang Kaew, Neko Jump and K-Otic. RS also launched a website, zheza.com, to serve as a community site for its target group.

Kamikaze produced several hits in its early years, and by its fifth year, had 32 artists under its umbrella. However, Sudhipong departed the company in 2010, and the label gradually lost most of its original artists as they outgrew their intended demographic. The label's management also changed direction, attempting to target more provincial audiences in addition to its originally urban audience—in 2013, Kamikaze group 3.2.1's single "Splash Out" featured singer Bitoey from Kamikaze's sister luk thung label R Siam, and its music video became a viral sensation. However, while the label continued to add new singers to its lineup, they failed to generate the same level of reception, and the label eventually became inactive, amidst the decline experienced by the wider music industry. In September 2017, a rumour circulated online that Kamikaze had closed down. This was initially denied by some reports, but the label later became inactive and was regarded to have unofficially ceased operations in 2017, however, it resumed operations in 2020 in the midst of the COVID-19 pandemic in Thailand.

See also

List of Thai pop artists
Thai pop music

References

External links
Kamikaze official website 

Thai popular music
Thai record labels
Record labels established in 2007
2007 establishments in Thailand
RS Group